SKYbrary is a wiki created by the European Organisation for the Safety of Air Navigation, International Civil Aviation Organization, and the Flight Safety Foundation to create a comprehensive source of aviation safety information freely available online. It was launched in May 2008 on a platform based on MediaWiki. The Flight Safety Foundation (a founding member) defines SKYbrary's goal as: capturing authoritative aviation industry information and create cumulative knowledge, especially with regard to critical safety issues. HindSight Magazine related to SKYbrary received the Cecil A. Brownlow Publication Award in 2009 at the FSF International Air Safety Seminar (IASS).

SKYbrary's way of working
SKYbrary is driven by a risk based knowledge management approach, meaning:
 Information must be in the right place at the right time.
 Managing knowledge helps ensure that organizations have appropriate capabilities in place (linking ability to innovate and capacity planning).
 Effective management of knowledge helps organizations share best practice more effectively, avoiding duplication of effort, whatever the daily operational constraints.

SKYbrary's Management and Quality Assurance process is described in detail on Skybrary Content Management.

SKYbrary uses the Semantic MediaWiki extension to annotate semantic data within articles.

SKYbrary structure
The SKYbrary front page gives visitors access to aviation safety knowledge via three portals. Each portal then contains numerous categories of articles chosen because of their relevance to aviation safety professionals. Current categories in use:

Operational Issues

 Air Ground Communication
 Airspace Infringement
 Bird Strike
 Controlled Flight Into Terrain
 Fire
 Ground Operations
 Human Factors
 Level Bust
 Loss of Control
 Loss of Separation
 Runway Excursion
 Runway Incursion
 Wake Vortex Turbulence
 Weather
 General

Enhancing Safety

 Airworthiness
 Flight Technical
 Safety Management
 Safety Nets
 Theory of Flight
 General

Safety Regulations

 Certification
 ESARRs
 Licensing
 Regulation
 General

Miscellaneous

 Author's Articles
 Accident and Serious Incident Reports
 Help

References

External links

 SKYbrary website
 EUROCONTROL, 
 ICAO
 Flight Safety Foundation.
 DNV (Det Norske Veritas) about the Safety Imperative
 Air Transport News
 SKYbrary a safety wiki
 SKYway spring 2008
  Le Knowledge management, ou mémoire collective de l'entreprise

Aviation safety
Semantic wikis
Aviation websites
Internet properties established in 2008